Brian Moran is an American politician and a member of the Democratic Party of Virginia.

Brian Moran may also refer to:
Brian Moran (baseball) (born 1988), American professional baseball pitcher
Brian T. Moran, United States Attorney